The 1994 GM Goodwrench Dealer 400 was the 21st stock car race of the 1994 NASCAR Winston Cup Series season and the 25th iteration of the event. The race was held on Sunday, August 21, 1994, in Brooklyn, Michigan, at Michigan International Speedway, a two-mile (3.2 km) moderate-banked D-shaped speedway. The race took the scheduled 200 laps to complete. At race's end, Geoff Bodine, driving for his own Geoff Bodine Racing team, would manage to dominate the race to take his 17th career NASCAR Winston Cup Series victory and his second victory of the season. To fill out the top three, Roush Racing driver Mark Martin and Precision Products Racing driver Rick Mast would finish second and third, respectively.

The race weekend was marred when on Saturday, a near-fatal crash involving championship contender Ernie Irvan would occur in the race's first Saturday practice session. Irvan would suffer a basilar skull fracture and a collapsed lung, and it would take over a year for Irvan to get back into the NASCAR Winston Cup Series.

Background 

The race was held at Michigan International Speedway, a two-mile (3.2 km) moderate-banked D-shaped speedway located in Brooklyn, Michigan. The track is used primarily for NASCAR events. It is known as a "sister track" to Texas World Speedway as MIS's oval design was a direct basis of TWS, with moderate modifications to the banking in the corners, and was used as the basis of Auto Club Speedway. The track is owned by International Speedway Corporation. Michigan International Speedway is recognized as one of motorsports' premier facilities because of its wide racing surface and high banking (by open-wheel standards; the 18-degree banking is modest by stock car standards).

Entry list 

 (R) denotes rookie driver.

*Withdrew due to injuries sustained in the race weekend's second practice.

Qualifying 
Qualifying was split into two rounds. The first round was held on Friday, August 19, at 3:30 PM EST. Each driver would have one lap to set a time. During the first round, the top 20 drivers in the round would be guaranteed a starting spot in the race. If a driver was not able to guarantee a spot in the first round, they had the option to scrub their time from the first round and try and run a faster lap time in a second round qualifying run, held on Saturday, August 20, at 10:30 AM EST. As with the first round, each driver would have one lap to set a time. For this specific race, positions 21-40 would be decided on time, and depending on who needed it, a select amount of positions were given to cars who had not otherwise qualified but were high enough in owner's points; up to two provisionals were given. If needed, a past champion who did not qualify on either time or provisionals could use a champion's provisional, adding one more spot to the field.

Eight drivers would fail to qualify, in addition to one withdrawn entry.

Full qualifying results

Ernie Irvan practice crash 
At around 8:40 AM EST, nearing the end of the first practice session that occurred on Saturday, Robert Yates Racing driver Ernie Irvan was told to go for a practice run of 10 laps. The weather was extremely foggy and hazy according to Irvan's crew chief Larry McReynolds. In an interview for a documentary, McReynolds would say that Irvan would have a tendency to run a couple extra laps in order to "feel the car out". Irvan had completed his 10 lap run when he decided to run one more lap, as McReynolds had anticipated. Musgrave would then say that Irvan tried to lock the brakes up in vain, as the car careened towards the outside wall. In another report by Ricky Rudd's crew chief, Bill Ingle, he had saw Irvan's car slip onto it's left side before flipping back onto all four wheels and stopping.

When first responders had arrived at the crash scene, they saw Irvan's mouth filled and spilling with blood, along with his nose also spilling blood; with this, his brain could not get enough oxygen in order to live. The doctor at the scene, Dr. John Maino, ordered an emergency tracheotomy to be performed on Irvan while he was in the car. The kit Maino had was missing his surgical knife, so he used a pocket knife in order to perform the tracheotomy, which was successful. After inserting a tube to let air into Irvan's system, he was airlifted to the St. Joesph Mercy Hospital in Ypsilanti, Michigan where the doctor at the hospital, Dr. Errol Erlandson had reported that Irvan had suffered "severe major injuries in two organ areas, either of which could be fatal." Erlandson would report that Irvan had suffered a skull fracture along with bruised lungs that had filled with fluid. According to Ernie's wife, Kim, the doctor gave a 10-15% chance of survival to live through the night. He would manage to make it through the night, but was unconscious for the next two days in critical condition. On Monday, his medication was reduced when he would regain some consciousness, with Irvan being able to move all of his extremities; but he was still in critical condition. After around a month of recovery, Erlandson had reported that the condition of Irvan had been upgraded to "good", with his lungs back to normal and his brain recovering fast in a "miraculous" recovery. With this report, Irvan was allowed to head back to his home in Charlotte, North Carolina and enter the Charlotte Institute of Rehabilitation for further recovery.

One week later, Irvan would make his first public appearance, making a news conference. In the conference, Irvan stated that he had hopes of returning to racing at the 1995 Daytona 500, and stated that his rehabilitation had been going well. While he would not be featured on the entry list for that year's Daytona 500, he would eventually be cleared to race on September 5, and would eventually race his first NASCAR Winston Cup Series race in the 1995 Tyson Holly Farms 400.

Race results

Standings after the race 

Drivers' Championship standings

Note: Only the first 10 positions are included for the driver standings.

References 

1994 NASCAR Winston Cup Series
NASCAR races at Michigan International Speedway
August 1994 sports events in the United States
1994 in sports in Michigan